Charles Wade Bell (born January 3, 1945) is a former middle distance runner from the United States, who competed at the 1968 Summer Olympics in Mexico City. He is best known for winning the gold medal in the men's 800 m event at the 1967 Pan American Games in Winnipeg, Manitoba, Canada.

Career 
Wade Bell ran collegiately for the University of Oregon and professionally for Oregon Track Club. In 1968, Bell was a member of Oregon TC's 4x800 meter relay team, which broke the world record in the event at the time, although it was not ratified by the IAAF. Bell was the 17th American man to break 4 minutes in the mile, doing so in 1966.

Post Professional Career 
Wade Bell remained actively involved in Track and Field. In 1970, Bell began his service as a course clerk at Oregon's Hayward field. Throughout the 1970s, Bell served as president of the Oregon Track Club and directed the Prefontaine classic.

References

1945 births
Living people
American male middle-distance runners
Athletes (track and field) at the 1967 Pan American Games
Athletes (track and field) at the 1968 Summer Olympics
Olympic track and field athletes of the United States
Oregon Ducks men's track and field athletes
Sportspeople from Ogden, Utah
Pan American Games gold medalists for the United States
Pan American Games medalists in athletics (track and field)
Medalists at the 1967 Pan American Games